Virbia schadei is a moth in the family Erebidae first described by Peter Jörgensen in 1935. It is found in Paraguay.

References

schadei
Moths described in 1935